This is a list of Kristin Chenoweth's filmography, concert appearances, books and theatre credits.

Theatre

Workshops
 Zombie Prom, Toffee
 Thoroughly Modern Millie, Millie Dilmount
 Young Frankenstein, Elizabeth
 Soapdish, Celeste Talbert
 Tammy Faye Bakker: The Musical, Tammy Faye Bakker

Film

Television

Concerts
Tours
 Kristin Chenoweth in Concert: May 9, 2012 – Dec. 10, 2012 (27 shows)
 Coming Home Tour: Aug. 8, 2015 – October 9, 2016 (68 shows; 25 in 2015, 43 in 2016)
 Kristin Chenoweth: Live on Tour: January 21 – May 20, 2017 (25 shows)

Other Concerts
 Sep. 10, 2004 – Carnegie Hall
 Jan. 19, 2007 – Metropolitan Opera House
 Jan. 10, 2009 – Fabulous Fox Theatre
 Feb. 23, 2009 – Ralph Freud Playhouse
 May 11, 2009 – New York City Center
 Oct. 24, 2009 – Scottsdale Performing Arts
 Dec. 15/17, 2009 – Beacon Theatre
 May 1/2 & Oct. 15/16, 2010 – Civic Center Music Hall
 Dec. 31, 2010 – Walt Disney Concert Hall
 Sep. 17, 2011 – Grand Ole Opry
 Aug. 23/24, 2013 – Hollywood Bowl
 Oct. 5, 2013 – Saenger Theatre
 Dec. 31, 2013 – Smith Center
 Feb. 5, 2014 – American Music Theatre
 Feb. 7, 2014 – Long Island University
 Feb. 9, 2014 – Proctor's Theatre
 Feb. 12, 2014 – The Kentucky Center
 Feb. 15, 2014 – Majestic Theatre
 May 3, 2014 – Carnegie Hall
 Jul. 12, 2014 – Royal Albert Hall
 Mar. 18, 2015 – Civic Center Music Hall
 Jun. 29, 2015 – Voice for the Voiceless #Stars4FosterKids at the St. James Theatre
 Oct. 20, 2017 – London Palladium

Books
 A Little Bit Wicked: Life, Love, and Faith in Stages (2009)
 What Will I Do With My Love Today (2022)
 My Moment (2022)
 I'm No Philosopher, But I Got Thoughts (2023)

Albums
 Let Yourself Go (2001)
 As I Am (2005)
 A Lovely Way to Spend Christmas (2008)
 Some Lessons Learned (2011)
 Coming Home (2014)
 The Art of Elegance (2016)
 For the Girls (2019)

References

Chenoweth, Kristin
Chenoweth, Kristin